The 2019 BYU Cougars football team represented Brigham Young University in the 2019 NCAA Division I FBS football season. The Cougars were led by fourth-year head coach Kalani Sitake, and played their home games at LaVell Edwards Stadium. This was the eighth year that BYU competed as an NCAA Division I FBS independent.

Before the season

Coaching changes
On January 14, 2019 Ryan Pugh was announced as the new offensive coordinator at Troy leaving a vacancy on the offensive staff. On February 14, 2019, Eric Mateos was named the offensive line coach.

2019 recruits

2018 returned missionaries

2019 other additions

2019 departures

Schedule
Following their win over Idaho State on November 16, the Cougars accepted an invitation to the 2019 Hawaii Bowl.

Source:

Game summaries

Utah

Sources:

Uniform combination: white helmet, royal blue jersey, white pants w/ royal blue accents.
There was a 58-minute weather delay during the fourth quarter (Thunderstorms).

at Tennessee

Sources:

Uniform combination: white helmet, white jersey, navy pants w/ white accents.

USC

Sources:

Uniform combination: white helmet, navy jerseys, white pants w/ navy accents

Washington

Sources:

Uniform combination: (Throwbacks) white helmet, white jerseys, royal blue pants w/ white accents

at Toledo

Sources:

Uniform combination: white helmet, white jersey, navy pants w/ white accents.

at South Florida

Sources:

Uniform combination: white helmet, white jerseys, white pants w/ navy accents

Boise State

Sources:

Uniform combination: white helmet, royal blue jerseys, white pants w/ royal blue accents

at Utah State

Sources:

Uniform combination: white helmet, white jerseys, white pants w/ royal blue accents

Liberty

Sources:

Uniform combination: white helmet, navy jerseys, white pants w/ navy accents

Idaho State

Sources:

Uniform combination: white helmet, royal blue jerseys, white pants w/ royal blue accents

at UMass

Sources:

Uniform combination: white helmet, white jerseys, navy pants w/ white accents

at San Diego State

Sources:

Uniform combination: white helmet, white jerseys, royal blue pants w/ white accents

Hawai'i

Sources:

Uniform combination: white helmet, royal blue jerseys, white pants w/ royal blue accents

Media

Football Media Day

Affiliates

BYU Radio- Flagship Station Nationwide (Dish Network 980, Sirius XM 143, KBYU 89.1 FM HD 2, TuneIn radio, and byuradio.org)
KSL 102.7 FM and 1160 AM- (Salt Lake City / Provo, Utah and ksl.com)
KSNA- Blackfoot / Idaho Falls / Pocatello / Rexburg, Idaho (games)
KSPZ- Blackfoot / Idaho Falls / Pocatello / Rexburg, Idaho (coaches' shows)
KMXD- Monroe / Manti, Utah
KSVC- Richfield / Manti, Utah
KDXU- St. George, Utah

Personnel

Coaching staff

Roster

Depth chart

Rankings

References

BYU
BYU Cougars football seasons
BYU Cougars football